"Here We Go" is a song by Swedish artist and film/music video director Stakka Bo, released in 1993 as the first single from his debut album, Supermarket (1993). The song features vocals by Swedish singers Nana Hedin and Katarina Wilczewski, and was very successful in Europe, charting in several countries. The artist and song was by many music critics compared to English hip hop/electronic dance group Stereo MC's, and the accompanying music video was played frequently on music channels such as MTV.

Background
While at university, Bo dated La Camilla of Swedish band Army of Lovers, who introduced him to the Swedish music business. He started out as one half of Eurodance duo E-Type + Stakka B, but went solo after two singles, continuing to release music as Stakka Bo.

Chart performance
"Here We Go" became a major hit in Europe and remains the most successful release by Stakka Bo. It peaked within the top 10 in Austria (6), Denmark (10), Iceland (5), Ireland (8), Norway (10), Sweden (4) and Switzerland (7). Additionally, the song was a top 20 hit in Germany (15), the Netherlands (20) and the United Kingdom, as well as on the Eurochart Hot 100, where "Here We Go" entered on 26 June 1993 at number 76 and peaked at number 17 on 16 October. On the European Dance Radio Chart, it fared even better, going to number 11. In the UK, it reached number 13, after entering the UK Singles Chart as number 19 and peaking the second week, on September 26, 1993. The single spent two weeks at that position. In the US, it reached number 20 on the Billboard Alternative Songs chart.

Critical reception
AllMusic editor Ryan Randall Goble stated that "this upbeat and fun pop music [is] the clear offspring of early-'90s genre-bending in pop, hip-hop, and alternative". J.D. Considine from The Baltimore Sun mentioned "the cutting critique of consumerism that bubbles beneath the surface", and called it "irresistibly catchy". Larry Flick from Billboard wrote that "high on energy and heavy on the accent, this well-crafted British rap attack invades the body, mind, and soul." He added, "Conga drums and fluttering flutes join a strong-piped female backing vocal to create this eccentric, lively track. With radio finally opening its mind to overseas rap, this Stereo MC's-like entry should fit right in at both top 40 and rhythm crossover." Swedish Expressen viewed it as "very funny". Katrine Ring from Danish Gaffa described the music video of "Here We Go" as "charming". Dave Sholin from the Gavin Report felt that Stakka Bo "has a sound that's reminiscent of the Stereo MC's and one hot chorus that gets stronger every time it's played." 

In his weekly UK chart commentary, James Masterton wrote, "Just for a change we have MTV to thank for this one. So strong was this debut single from the Swedish group that the music video channel which normally gives dance a wide berth, leaped on it immediately." He concluded, "One of the more brilliant pop records in the charts at the moment." Pan-European magazine Music & Media felt that he is "in the same league" with the Stereo MC's, and added that the tune is "very radio-friendly". Alan Jones from Music Week called it a "impressive debut" and "an easy-paced affair with a friendly rap, an oft-repeated femme voice intoning the title and some cool flute tootling, it's got to happen." Karen Holmes from The Network Forty noted its "ska music influences", declaring it as "a dance flavored pop single". James Hamilton from the RM Dance Update described it as "Stereo MC's meet Ace of Base style". Mike Soutar from Smash Hits gave it five out of five, naming it Best New Single. He felt that "this tune could get the most depressed person you know putting away their razor blades. Breezier than a string vest on Ben Nevis, "Here We Go" is like Stereo MC's without the right-on element, or the Shamen without technological paraphernalia. Except better."

Airplay
"Here We Go" was positioned at number three when the first European airplay chart Border Breakers was compiled due to crossover airplay in western central, central north-west and southern Europe. It peaked at number two on the following week.

Music video
A music video was produced to promote the single, directed by Stakka Bo himself. The video is set in a splitscreen brown space with Stakka Bo and Oskar Franzén performing on each side, while model/dancer Alma Jansson-Eklund is intercut during the chorus, lipsyncing to Nana Hedin's vocals. A wave motion machine also appear. An image from the video is used on the cover for the single. "Here We Go" was later published on Stakka Bo's official YouTube channel in January 2016, and had generated more than 6.4 million views as of December 2022.

Use in media
The song appeared in an episode of the animated television series Beavis and Butt-Head, in the films Prêt-à-Porter, Never Been Kissed, Alien Autopsy and in the video game UEFA Euro 2004.

Track listing

Charts

Weekly charts

Year-end charts

References

1993 debut singles
1993 songs
Dance-pop songs
English-language Swedish songs
Jazz rap songs
Nana Hedin songs
Stockholm Records singles
Works by Johan Renck